Eidghah is a locality that serves as the administrative headquarters of Astore District in the Diamer Division of Gilgit-Baltistan.

The local name for the town is "Sango". It is bounded to the east by Choungrah, to the north by Astore Bazar, to the west by Fina and to the south by Bolen. There are two UC's in Eidghah Village. Eidghah is the valley through which you can reach Gorikot (the largest valley of District Astore) then Gudai Chilum and Daosai. The people of Sango are called Songoch.

Sub Villages

The following are the small villages associated with Eidghah:
Ibraheemi Het
Raja Mahala
Ghrom
Dorikot
Akhrial
Ghanu
Fatbati het
Bunjo
bade Het

References

Astore District